This is a list of the units into which the rock succession of New Zealand is formally divided. As new geological relationships have been discovered new names have been proposed and others are made obsolete. Not all these changes have been universally adopted. This table is based on the 2014 New Zealand Stratigraphic Lexicon (Litho2014). However, obsolete names that are still in use and names postdating the lexicon are included if it aids in understanding.

Names for particular rock units have two parts, a proper name which is almost always a geographic location where the rock is found and a hierarchical rank (e.g. Waitematā Group). This ranking system starts with individual 'beds' of rock which can be grouped into 'members', members are grouped into 'formations', formations into 'subgroups' then 'groups'. In New Zealand, groups are further combined into  'supergroups' or for basement rocks into terranes. Not all of these hierarchical layers are necessarily present within a particular rock succession. Many New Zealand rocks can also have names based on their major rock types, such as the Wooded Peak Limestone or the Hawks Crag Breccia.

Summary of New Zealand high order rock names
New Zealand stratigraphy has also informally been divided into two 'megasequences'. The Austral Superprovince (Cambrian-Cretaceous) includes all basement rocks and the Zealandia Megasequence (Cretaceous-Holocene) refers to those, younger rocks, that cover them. The Austral Superprovince is divided into the Eastern and Western Province, which have seven and two terranes respectively. The Zealandia Megasequence is divided into five supergroups, from oldest to youngest they are the Momotu, Haerenga, Waka, Māui and Pākihi supergroups.

Basement rocks (Austral Superprovince)

Cover sequence (Zealandia Megasequence)

See also
Geology of New Zealand
New Zealand geologic time scale
List of rock formations of New Zealand

References

External links
New Zealand Stratigraphic Lexicon

 
 
 
Stratigraphy
Rock formations of Otago
Rock formations of Canterbury, New Zealand